Pseudocorax is an extinct genus of mackerel sharks that lived during the Late Cretaceous. It contains six valid species that have been found in Europe, the Middle East, North Africa, and North America. It was formerly assigned to the family Anacoracidae, but is now placed in its own family Pseudocoracidae along with Galeocorax. The former species "P." australis and "P." primulus have been reidentified as species of Echinorhinus and Squalicorax, respectively.

References

Lamniformes
Cretaceous sharks
Cretaceous fish of Europe
Prehistoric shark genera
Mooreville Chalk